Old St. Hilary's Landmark is a former mission church place of worship and now a historic landmark owned and maintained by the Belvedere-Tiburon Landmarks Society, Tiburon Peninsula, Marin County, California, United States. The landmark is situated on the flank of the Tiburon Hills, an area characterized by serpentine soils and hence has a distinct plant community. The area surrounding the church is a Marin County protected area, the Old Saint Hilary's Open Space Preserve. The church building was listed on the National Register of Historic Places in 2020.

An endangered wildflower species, Streptanthus niger, commonly called the Tiburon jewelflower, grows near the church.

Line notes

References
Belvedere-Tiburon Landmarks Society
Marin County Parks

Churches in Marin County, California
Protected areas of Marin County, California
Tiburon, California
Religion in the San Francisco Bay Area
National Register of Historic Places in Marin County, California
Churches on the National Register of Historic Places in California
Roman Catholic churches completed in 1888
19th-century Roman Catholic church buildings in the United States